Blaže Georgioski (Macedonian Cyrillic: Блаже Георгиоски; born 1 December 1975, in Prilep) is a Macedonian retired football player.

Club career
Born in Prilep, he started his career in 1994 in his home town club FK Pobeda. In 1998, he moved to Serbia to play in FK Sartid, club nowadays called FK Smederevo. His good exhibitions make him move to the giants European 1991 Champions FK Crvena Zvezda where he won the Championship in the season 1999–2000. After having returned to play again in Pobeda Prilep, in 2006 he moved to Australia to play in the Victorian Premier League club Preston Lions FC, where he played for 2 years winning the VPL final for Preston Lions in 2007.

International career
Since his good exhibitions with Red Star that Georgioski started receiving calls to the national squad. He made his senior debut for Macedonia in a February 2000 friendly match against Yugoslavia and has earned a total of 7 caps, scoring no goals. His final international was a November 2005 friendly against Iran.

Honours
 Red Star Belgrade
1 time First League of FR Yugoslavia Champion: 1999–00
1 time Yugoslav Cup winner: 2000
 Pobeda Prilep
1 time Macedonian Prva Liga Champion: 2003–04
1 time Macedonian Cup winner: 2002
 Preston Lions
1 time Victorian Premier League Champion: 2007

References

External links

 

1975 births
Living people
Sportspeople from Prilep
Association football midfielders
Macedonian footballers
North Macedonia international footballers
FK Pobeda players
FK Smederevo players
Red Star Belgrade footballers
Preston Lions FC players
Macedonian First Football League players
First League of Serbia and Montenegro players
Victorian Premier League players
Macedonian expatriate footballers
Expatriate footballers in Serbia and Montenegro
Macedonian expatriate sportspeople in Serbia and Montenegro
Expatriate soccer players in Australia
Macedonian expatriate sportspeople in Australia